Nguyễn Trọng Đại (born 7 April 1997) is a Vietnamese footballer who plays as a centre-back and midfielder for V.League 1 club Nam Dinh.

Honours

Club
Viettel F.C
V.League 2
 Runners-up :  2016

International
Vietnam U23
AFC U-23 Championship
 Runners-up :  : 2018
M-150 Cup
 Third place:  : 2017

References 

1997 births
Living people
Vietnamese footballers
Association football central defenders
Viettel FC players
V.League 1 players
People from Hải Dương province
Vietnam international footballers